St Andrew's School for Girls is an independent Christian girls-only day and boarding school and co-educational preschool in Johannesburg, South Africa. The school has a student body of around 1100 girls. St Andrew's has been voted as Best English High School, Best Private School for Girls and Best Nursery School by the public in the popular newspaper The Star "Your Choice 2008" Poll.

History

St Andrew's School for Girls was founded in 1902 by two young Scottish women, Jean Fletcher and Jessie Johnson. Initially St Andrew's was situated in Hospital Hill in an area now called Houghton. The two Scottish women later bought Bedford Court, a large farm previously owned by a mining mogul of his time - Sir George Farrar. The house which is situated on Bedford Farm was designed by Sir Herbert Baker and still stands today as a heritage building.

The school motto, Per Angusta Ad Augusta, has the meaning 'Through trials and tribulations to glory'. The school philosophy is "Skilled for Life".

Academics 
St Andrew's pupils write the Independent Examinations Board exams each year and pupils consistently achieve excellent results. The majority of students continue with tertiary education in South Africa or abroad. St Andrew’s strength lies in its staff/pupil ratio, with classes rarely exceeding 27 girls.

Sport 
The school sporting facilities include
 Athletics: Grass track
 Diving: diving well is part of the Aquatic Centre
 Hockey: Water-based Astroturf with lights
 Netball: 10 courts with lights
 Swimming: Aquatic Centre features an indoor 25m 10 lane pool and an indoor learn-to-swim pool
 Squash: 4 courts
 Tennis: 9 courts
 Rowing: Train at Victoria Lake Club and row at Roodeplaat Dam
 Equestrian: Girls ride at their own stables.
 Golf: Girls play at Royal Johannesburg and Kensington Golf Club
St Andrew's has produced numerous national and provincial sportswomen.

Environmental responsibility 
Eco School is an international programme that operates in over 40 countries worldwide. The programme is about improving environmental management at the school, as well as learning, and interaction with the broader community who share our environment is developed. Eco-Schools South Africa has specific criteria that schools need to meet within at least five years. Progress in the areas of curriculum, action and community is reviewed annually and successful schools are awarded a flag or certificate to mark their school’s eco-school status in the five-year award system. St Andrew’s joined the programme in 2006 and currently hold a Green Flag, platinum certificate (the highest level) and the International Flag.

Notable alumnae
 Sheila Kohler, author
 Nthati Moshesh, actress
 Cathy O'Dowd, rock climber, mountaineer, author and motivational speaker

External links

Boarding schools in South Africa
Educational institutions established in 1902
Girls' schools in South Africa
Herbert Baker buildings and structures
Private schools in Gauteng
Schools in Germiston
Schools in Johannesburg
1902 establishments in South Africa